is a town located in Nakatado District, Kagawa Prefecture, Japan. , the town had an estimated population of 8,105 in 3618 households and a population density of 960 persons per km². The town is best known as the site of Shikoku's largest shrine complex, the Kotohira Shrine (popularly known as Konpira-san).

Geography
Kotohira is located in southwestern Kagawa Prefecture. The west side of the town area runs along the foot of Mt.Kotohira

Neighbouring municipalities 
Kagawa Prefecture
 Zentsūji
Mitoyo
 Mannō

Climate
Kotohira has a Humid subtropical climate (Köppen Cfa) characterized by warm summers and cool winters with light snowfall.  The average annual temperature in Kotohira is 15.1 °C. The average annual rainfall is 1439 mm with September as the wettest month. The temperatures are highest on average in January, at around 26.2 °C, and lowest in January, at around 4.7 °C.

Demographics
Per Japanese census data, the population of Kotohira has been declining steadily since the 1960s.

History 
The area of Kotohira was part of ancient Sanuki Province. The town developed as a market before the gates of the Kotohira Shrine, which has attracted pilgrims since prehistoric times. During the Edo Period, the area was tenryō territory ruled directly by the Tokugawa shogunate. Following the Meiji restoration, the town of Kotohira was established with the creation of the modern municipalities system on February 15, 1890. Kotohira annexed the village of Enai  on April 1,1955.

Government
Kotohira has a mayor-council form of government with a directly elected mayor and a unicameral town council of 10 members. Kotohira, together with Mannō, contributes two members to the Kagawa Prefectural Assembly. In terms of national politics, the town is part of Kagawa 3rd district  of the lower house of the Diet of Japan.

Economy
As the monzenmachi of the Korohira Shrine, the local economy is heavily centered on tourism.

Education
Kotohira has three public elementary schools and one public middle school operated by the town government, and one public high schools operated by the Kagawa Prefectural Board of Education.

Transportation

Railways 
 Shikoku Railway Company - Dosan Line
 
 Takamatsu-Kotohira Electric Railroad Kotoden Kotohira Line
  -

Highways

Local attractions
Kotohira Shrine
 Kanamaru-za, Japan's oldest surviving Kabuki playhouse.

References

External links

Official website  (English version)

Towns in Kagawa Prefecture
Kotohira, Kagawa